Groşani may refer to several villages in Romania:

 Groşani, a village in Poienarii de Muscel Commune, Argeș County
 Groşani, a village in Costeşti Commune, Buzău County
 Groşani, a village in the town of Slănic, Prahova County

See also
 Groși (disambiguation)
 Groș (disambiguation)
 Groșii (disambiguation)
 Grosu